Cooter Township is an inactive township in Pemiscot County, in the U.S. state of Missouri.

Cooter Township takes its name from the community of Cooter, Missouri.

References

Townships in Missouri
Townships in Pemiscot County, Missouri